Melaleuca idana is a plant in the myrtle family, Myrtaceae, and is endemic to the south-west of Western Australia. It is a small shrub with fine, silky hairs covering the new foliage and heads of pink to deep purple flowers in early spring. It is similar to Melaleuca sapientes, differing mainly in the shape of the leaves in cross-section and the length of its styles.

Description

The flowers are a shade of pink to deep purple, arranged in heads on the ends of branches which continue to grow after flowering.

Taxonomy and naming
Melaleuca idana was first formally described in 1999 by Lyndley Craven in Australian Systematic Botany from a specimen collected on the northern boundary of Kalbarri National Park. The specific epithet (idana) is from an Ancient Greek word meaning "fair" or "comely" referring to the attractive flowers.

Distribution and habitat
This melaleuca occurs in the Wannoo and Kalbarri districts in the Geraldton Sandplains and Yalgoo biogeographic regions. It grows in dry yellow sand on sandplains.

Conservation status
Melaleuca idana is listed as "not threatened" by the Government of Western Australia Department of Parks and Wildlife.

References

idana
Plants described in 1999
Endemic flora of Western Australia
Taxa named by Lyndley Craven